John Strassburger (April 6, 1942 - September 22, 2010) was an American academic administrator who served as the president of Ursinus College from 1994 to 2010. He graduated from Bates College in Lewiston, Maine, the University of Cambridge in England and Princeton University in New Jersey. He successively served as professor of history, dean of the college, and vice president for academic affairs at Knox College before assuming the presidency of Ursinus. He died on September 22, 2010, from prostate cancer.

See also 
 List of Bates College people

References 

Alumni of the University of Cambridge
American academic administrators
Bates College alumni
Knox College (Illinois) faculty
Living people
Princeton University alumni
Ursinus College faculty
1942 births